Neottiglossa is a genus of stink bugs in the family Pentatomidae. There are about 10 described species in Neottiglossa.

Species
These 10 species belong to the genus Neottiglossa:
 Neottiglossa bifida (A.Costa, 1847)
 Neottiglossa cavifrons Stål, 1872
 Neottiglossa flavomarginata (Lucas, 1849)
 Neottiglossa leporina (Herrich-Schäffer, 1830)
 Neottiglossa lineolata (Mulsant & Rey, 1852)
 Neottiglossa pusilla (Gmelin, 1790)
 Neottiglossa sulcifrons Stål, 1872
 Neottiglossa trilineata (Kirby, 1837)
 Neottiglossa tumidifrons Downes, 1928
 Neottiglossa undata (Say, 1832)

References

Further reading

External links

 

Pentatomidae genera
Articles created by Qbugbot
Pentatomini